Ballarat Road (in its westernmost part the Western Highway) is a major urban arterial road in the western suburbs of Melbourne, Victoria, Australia.

History
Previously part of Western Highway, the road was bypassed as the main route through western Melbourne when the Deer Park bypass opened in 2009; the road name was devolved back to its original identity as Ballarat Road as a consequence, however, the route is still co-signed as Western Highway on older signs. The highway was originally designated in the 1969 Melbourne Transportation Plan as part of the F12 Freeway corridor.

As a part of the Western Highway, the road was signed as National Route 8 in 1955. The Whitlam Government introduced the federal National Roads Act 1974, where roads declared as a National Highway were still the responsibility of the states for road construction and maintenance, but were fully compensated by the Federal government for money spent on approved projects. As an important interstate link between the capitals of Victoria and South Australia, the Western Highway was declared a National Highway in 1974.

With Victoria's conversion to the newer alphanumeric system in the late 1990s, the section between Ravenhall and Ardeer (where it met the Western Ring Road) was upgraded to National Highway M8; it was left as National Highway 8 east of the ring road along its original alignment into central Melbourne. Once the Deer Park bypass was opened in 2009 and National Route M8 was re-routed onto the new bypass, the old route was replaced with Metropolitan Route 8 from Ravenhall to the inner suburb of Footscray. 

The passing of the Road Management Act 2004 granted the responsibility of overall management and development of Victoria's major arterial roads to VicRoads: in 2014, VicRoads declared this road as Footscray-Caroline Springs Road (Arterial #5520), beginning in Footscray and ending in Ravenhall; the road is still presently known (and signposted) as Ballarat Road.

Geography
VicRoads' declaration states Ballarat Road starts at the intersection with Princes Highway (Geelong Road) in Footscray, however signposts still indicate the road starts west of Lynch's bridge across the Yarra River. It continues west through Maidstone, Braybrook, Sunshine, Albion, Cairnlea, Deer Park, Burnside, and Caroline Springs, with the route terminating at the junction of Caroline Springs Boulevard, Christies Road and the Western Freeway on ramp. Major junctions along the route include the Western Ring Road and the Western Freeway, where the route terminates as said above.

Turning onto Christies Road from the route terminus, road users are able to turn onto the Deer Park Bypass

Transport 
Tram route 82 runs along the Footscray section of Ballarat Road, between Gordon & Droop Streets. The Serviceton railway line from Southern Cross runs parallel to Ballarat Road from Sunshine about 1 km to the south, with stations at Albion, and Deer Park. Several bus routes run along Ballarat Road at various points (routes 215, 216, 220, 223, 256, 400, 406, 408, 410 and 456) with 456 continuing on the Western Freeway to Melton.

With three lanes running in each direction, between Deer Park and the Western Ring Road, this was one of the worst bottlenecks in western Melbourne with traffic reaching 70,000 vehicles per day, with 10 per cent of this consisting of heavy vehicles. This caused delays, in part due to seven traffic signals between the Western Ring Road and the start of the Western Freeway. With the completion of the Deer Park Bypass traffic volumes were predicted to decrease to local traffic standard since its opening on 5 April 2009.

In central Melbourne, Ballarat Road has a single carriageway from Braybrook and is a two lane arterial road, including one small stretch which shares the road with trams.

Major intersections and suburbs

See also 

 Western Highway

References

Streets in Melbourne
Highways and freeways in Melbourne
Transport in the City of Melton
Transport in the City of Brimbank
Transport in the City of Maribyrnong
Transport in the City of Melbourne (LGA)